KRSL-FM (95.9 FM) is a radio station licensed to Russell, Kansas, United States. The station is currently owned by White Communications, L.L.C.

History
The station was assigned the call letters KRSL-FM on 1978-09-21.  On 1984-02-08, the station changed its call sign to KCAY and on 2008-03-10 back to the current KRSL-FM

On September 23, 2015, KRSL-FM changed their format from classic hits to variety hits, branded as "95.9 Jack FM".

Previous logo

References

External links

RSL-FM
Radio stations established in 1978